Taipei Japanese School (TJS) is a Japanese international school located in Shilin District, Taipei. TJS was established in 1947 and mainly serves the children (up to junior high school) of Japanese expatriates in Taiwan.

Traditionally, TJS students have returned to Japan to commence their high school education, while a minority choose to attend Taipei American School, which is located across the street. Among the TJS students who chose the latter option was Taiwanese-Japanese actor Takeshi Kaneshiro. TJS moved to its current location in Tianmu in 1983.

With the departure of many Japanese expatriate families from Taiwan during the 1990s, TJS saw its enrollment decline significantly between 1990 and 2010.   However, enrollment began to bounce back by the 2010s.

Notable alumni
Takeshi Kaneshiro, actor
Yuriko Ishida, actress
Hikari Ishida, actress
Asei Kobayashi, composer

See also

Republic of China-aligned Chinese international schools in Japan:
 Osaka Chinese School
 Tokyo Chinese School
 Yokohama Overseas Chinese School

References
  Dohi, Yutaka (土肥 豊; Osaka University of Comprehensive Children Education). "The Present Situation and the Problems of the Japanese Schools in Taiwan" (台湾の日本人学校の現状と課題 ; Archive). Journal of Osaka University of Comprehensive Children Education (大阪総合保育大学紀要) (5), 153-172, 2011-03-20. Osaka University of Comprehensive Children Education. See profile at CiNii. English abstract available. Article available from the Osaka University of Comprehensive Children Education Library.

Notes

Further reading

Available online
 Osaki, Hirofumi (大崎 博史 Ōsaki Hirofumi; 国立特殊教育総合研究所教育相談部). "中国・広州日本人学校,香港・香港日本人学校小学部香港校,台湾・台北日本人学校における特別支援教育の実情と教育相談支援" (Archive). 世界の特殊教育 21, 57-63, 2007-03. National Institute of Special Needs Education (独立行政法人国立特別支援教育総合研究所). - See profile at CiNii.

Not available online
 Ikezaki Yatsuo (池崎 八生; Oita University教育福祉科学部) and Kimie Ikezaki (池崎 喜美恵 Ikezaki Kimie; Tokyo Gakugei University生活科学学科). "Actual condition of industrial arts and home economics, information education in The Japanese school (Taipei, Taichu)" (日本人学校における技術・家庭科教育および情報教育の現状(第1報) : 台北・台中日本人学校の中学部の生徒を対象に ). The Research Bulletin of the Faculty of Education and Welfare Science, Oita University (大分大学教育福祉科学部研究紀要) 23(2), 381-394, 2001-10. Oita University. See profile at CiNii. See profile at Oita University Library (大分大学学術情報拠点).
 Ikezaki, Yatsuo (池崎 八生; Oita University教育福祉科学部情報教育コース) and Kimie Ikezaki (池崎 喜美恵 Ikezaki Kimie; Tokyo Gakugei University教育学部生活科学学科). "Actual Condition of Industrial arts and Home Economics, Information Education in Japanese School (2nd report) : Students in Taiwan" (日本人学校における技術・家庭科教育および情報教育の現状(第2報) : 台湾在住の児童・生徒を対象に). The Research Bulletin of the Faculty of Education and Welfare Science, Oita University (大分大学教育福祉科学部研究紀要). 26(1), 151-165, 2004-04. Oita University. See profile at CiNii.
 Tsutsumi, Noboru (堤 登 Tsutsumi Noboru; 前台北日本人学校校長・大阪府豊能町立光風台小学校校長). "珠玉の3年間 : 台北日本人学校での教育実践を通して." 在外教育施設における指導実践記録 24, 125-128, 2001. Tokyo Gakugei University. See profile at CiNii.
 平田 幸男. "活用事例 海外日本人学校における校内ネットワーク整備について--台北日本人学校での経過報告." Computer & Education (コンピュータ & エデュケーション) 16, 43-46, 2004. CIEC. See profile at CiNii.
 平田 幸男 (神戸市立千代が丘小学校). "海外日本人学校における校内ネットワーク整備について:―台北日本人学校での経過報告―." Computer & Education (コンピュータ & エデュケーション) 16(0), 43-46, 2004. CIEC. See profile at CiNii. Available at J-Stage and Crossref.
 今井 美樹. "台北日本人学校夏祭り." 交流 (836), 21-23, 2010-11 . 交流協会. See profile at CiNii.
 宇野 光道. "台北日本人学校における指導実践 (海外子女教育<特集>)." The Monthly Journal of Mombusho (文部時報) (1196), p64-67, 1977-01. ぎょうせい. See profile at CiNii.
 平川 惣一. "海外あちらこちら 台北日本人学校における国際結婚家庭子女の現状と課題." 教育じほう (622), 86-88, 1999-11. 東京都新教育研究会. See profile at CiNii.

External links

  Official website

International schools in Taipei
Taipei
Taipei